Slovenian song festival (In ) was a Slovenian music festival dedicated to a music genre known as Slovenian song that was most popular during the 1960s and 1970s and had a similarly high standing in Slovene culture as did the Sanremo Music Festival in Italian culture. It began in 1962 and ended in 1983, with an attempt at its revival in 1998.

History
The festival in 1962 was organized at the town of Bled, and in 1964 moved to Slovenia's capital city Ljubljana.

1960s and 1970s winners

References

Further reading
 Mosca Marco (2010): Slovenska Popevka e gli anni d'oro della canzone Slovena (In Italian), Lampi di Stampa

Music festivals in Slovenia
Slovenian folk music
Defunct music festivals
1962 establishments in Slovenia
1998 disestablishments in Slovenia